The Berenson Madonna is a c.1432-1437 tempera and gold on panel painting by Domenico Veneziano, now in the Berenson collection at Villa I Tatti in Settignano. It was auctioned by the Panciatichi family and acquired by Berenson for his personal collection.

References
 Web Gallery 
 Art in Tuscany 

Paintings in the Berenson collection
1430s paintings